The 2013–14 USC Trojans women's basketball team will represent University of Southern California during the 2013–14 NCAA Division I women's basketball season. The Trojans, led by first year head coach Cynthia Cooper-Dyke, play their home games at the Galen Center and were a members of the Pac-12 Conference. They finished with a record of 22–13 overall, 11–7 in Pac-12 play for a tie for 4th place. They won the 2014 Pac-12 Conference women's basketball tournament for the first time in school history. They earn an automatic bid to the 2014 NCAA Division I women's basketball tournament which they lost in the first round to St. John's.

Roster

Schedule

|-
!colspan=9| Exhibition

|-
!colspan=9| Regular Season

|-
!colspan=9 | 2014 Pac-12 Conference women's tournament

|-
!colspan=9 | 2014 NCAA women's tournament

Source

See also
2013–14 USC Trojans men's basketball team

References

USC Trojans women's basketball seasons
USC
USC
USC Trojans
USC Trojans